Anita Asiimwe is a Rwandan Minister of State and a specialist in public health. Since October 2017, she has been the National Coordinator of the National Early Childhood Development Program.

She is also one of the founding members of the Africa Constituency Bureau, an Advocacy and CCMs Coordinating Body that advocates for African voices in the Global Fund against HIV, TB and Malaria.

References 

Living people
People from Kigali
Women government ministers of Rwanda
Year of birth missing (living people)